David Burnham Hill (November 11, 1937 – October 16, 2018) was an American professional baseball player, a pitcher who appeared in two games in the Major Leagues for the  Kansas City Athletics.

Hill signed with the Athletics in 1957 as a "Bonus Baby", under the Bonus Rule.  He debuted for the As without playing in the minor leagues on August 22 in relief against the defending world champion New York Yankees and surrendered a two-run home run to eventual Baseball Hall of Famer Yogi Berra during an 11–4 Kansas City loss.  Four days later he was treated roughly by the Boston Red Sox, also in relief, surrendering five runs (including homers to Frank Malzone and Jimmy Piersall) in only one-third of an inning. Boston routed the As, 16–0.

In 2⅓ big-league innings pitched, Hill allowed six hits, three bases on balls, and seven earned runs. He struck out one.

He played in the Kansas City farm system from 1958–61, rising to the middle level of the minors, before retiring.  After retiring, Hill earned a Masters degree from Loyola University and had a successful career in telecommunications.  In his final years, he owned and operated Wickwire Art Gallery (Hendersonville, NC) with his wife of over 46 years.  He was the father of three children and grandfather of nine.   Hill maintained a love for baseball all of his life. 

Hill died peacefully on October 16, 2018 after a brief battle with cancer.

See also
List of baseball players who went directly to Major League Baseball

References

External links

1937 births
2018 deaths
Albany Senators players
Baseball players from New Orleans
Kansas City Athletics players
Lewiston Broncs players
Major League Baseball pitchers
Northwestern Wildcats baseball players
Portsmouth-Norfolk Tides players
Rochester/Winona A's players
Sioux City Soos players